Genevieve Bell  is an Australian cultural anthropologist best known for her work at the intersection of cultural practice research and technological development (including as a pioneer in the field of futurist research), and for being an industry pioneer of the user experience field. Bell was the innagural director of the Autonomy, Agency and Assurance Innovation Institute (3Ai), which was co-founded by the Australian National University (ANU) and CSIRO’s Data61, and a Distinguished Professor of the ANU College of Engineering and Computer Science. In 2021, she became Director of the new ANU School of Cybernetics. She also holds the university's Florence Violet McKenzie Chair and is the first SRI International Engelbart Distinguished Fellow. Bell is also a Senior Fellow and Vice President at Intel. She is widely published, and holds 13 patents.

Early life
Daughter of renowned Australian anthropologist, Diane Bell, Genevieve Bell was born in Sydney and raised in a range of Australian communities, including Melbourne, Canberra, and in several Aboriginal Communities in the Northern Territory. Bell attended university in the United States, where she graduated from Bryn Mawr College in 1990 with a Bachelor of Arts and a Master of Philosophy in anthropology. Bell went on to attend Stanford University in Palo Alto, California, for graduate studies. In 1993, she earned her master's degree from Stanford, followed by a PhD in 1998, both in anthropology. Her doctoral research focused on the Carlisle Indian Industrial School which operated in rural Pennsylvania in the late 19th and early 20th centuries.

Career
From 1996 to 1998, Bell taught anthropology and Native American Studies at Stanford University, in both the department of anthropology and department of anthropological sciences, as well as in the continuing studies program.

She was recruited from her faculty position by Intel Corporation in 1998 to help build out their nascent social-science research competency in the advanced research and development labs. She was based at one of the company's campuses in Hillsboro, Oregon, where she worked as a cultural anthropologist studying how different cultures around the globe used technology. She and her colleagues helped re-orient Intel to a more market-inspired and experience-driven approach and she is widely credited with establishing User Experience as a recognised competency at Intel.

She started Intel's first User Experience Group in 2005, as part of Intel's Digital Home Group. The company named her an Intel Fellow, their highest technical rank, in November 2008 for her work in the Digital Home Group. She rejoined the advanced research and development labs in 2010, when Intel made her the director of their newly forming User Experience Research group. This group was Intel's first fully integrated user experience research and development group; they worked on questions of big data, smart transportation, next generation image technology and ideas about fear and wonder. After steering that group to a range of successes inside and outside the company, she was made a vice president in 2014 and senior fellow in 2016.

Bell's impact has been recognised repeatedly outside Intel.  In 2010, she was named one of the Top 25 Women in Technology to Watch by AlwaysOn and as one of the 100 Most Creative People in Business by Fast Company. In 2012, Bell was inducted to the Women in Technology International Hall of Fame and in 2013, she was named Anita Borg’s Women of Vision in Leadership. In 2014, she was included in Elle Magazine's first list of influential women in technology and also included in a new exhibit at London's Design Museum profiling 25 women from around the world.

Her first book, Divining a Digital Future: Mess and Mythology in Ubiquitous Computing, written in collaboration with Paul Dourish, is an exploration of the social and cultural aspects of ubiquitous computing, with a particular focus on the disciplinary and methodological issues that have shaped the ubiquitous computing research agenda. The book was published by MIT Press in 2011.

An earlier essay from 2007 by Bell, also co-authored with Dourish, "“Resistance is Futile”: Reading Science Fiction Alongside Ubiquitous Computing", has been widely cited as an inspiration for, or a key influence on, the emergence of the field of design fiction.

Bell was also a Thinker in Residence for South Australia from 2008 to 2010. Her visiting appointment was intended to help guide government policy surrounding a new national broadband initiative. Bell conducted ethnographic research and developed new innovative research methods to identify barriers to adoption and drivers around broadband uptake. Her final report, “Getting Connected, staying connected: exploring the role of new technology in Australian society” is available online.

After 18 years as Intel's resident anthropologist in Silicon Valley, Bell returned to Australia in 2017 as the first of five appointments under the ANU Vice-Chancellor Brian Schmidt's Entrepreneurial Fellows scheme. She is a distinguished professor at the ANU College of Engineering and Computer Science, where she is focusing on "exploring how to bring together data science, design thinking and ethnography to drive new approaches in engineering; and ... exploring the questions of what it means to be human in a data-driven economy and world". She is the university's inaugural appointee of the Florence Violet McKenzie Chair, named in honour of Australia's first female electrical engineer.

In 2017, the ANU announced a major 10-year plan to drive the expansion of its program in engineering and computer science. The expansion in part was to be led by Bell as the director of the newly founded Autonomy, Agency and Assurance Institute, to be known as the 3A Institute or 3Ai, co-founded by Australian National University and CSIRO’s Data61, Australia's largest data innovation network. The 3A Institute brings together a diverse team from a range of disciplines to tackle complex problems around artificial intelligence, data and technology and managing their impact on humanity.

In October 2017, Bell presented the ABC's 2017 Boyer Lectures, interrogating what it means to be human, and Australian, in a digital world. Bell joins the list of prominent Australians selected each year by the ABC since 1959 to present the annual Boyer Lectures and stimulate a national conversation on social, cultural and political issues of contemporary Australian society.

Since returning to Australia, Bell's expertise in the field of AI development and regulation has been recognised by government and industry. At the 2016 Advance Awards, Bell received the Award for Technology Innovation and Overall 2016 Advance Global Australian Award. In October 2018, Bell was elected as a fellow of the Australian Academy of Technology and Engineering (ATSE), a not-for-profit organisation which brings together leading minds in technology and engineering from academia, government and industry sectors. She was also appointed to the National Science and Technology Advisory Council among other members including Nobel Laureate and ANU Vice-Chancellor Brian Schmidt and Chair Prime Minister Scott Morrison. The council is responsible for providing expert advice to the prime minister and other ministers on science and technology challenges facing Australia.

In January 2019, Bell was appointed as an independent non-executive director of the Commonwealth Bank of Australia Board.

On January 22, 2020, Bell was named the first Engelbart Distinguished Fellow by SRI International. The fellowship is named after Douglas C. Engelbart, a pioneer of modern computing, and recognises 'visionaries who are disrupting the traditional way we interact with and view technology' from around the globe. Shortly after, Bell was appointed an Officer of the Order of Australia in the 2020 Australia Day Honours for distinguished service to education, particularly to the social sciences and cultural anthropology. That same year she was also elected as a Honorary Fellow of the Australian Academy of the Humanities.

In 2021 Genevievewas appointed Director of the new School of Cybernetics at the Australian National University, which as well as housing the 3A Institute, will build out capacity in Systems and Design.

References

External links

 ANU School of Cybernetics
 3Ai Website
 Genevieve Bell, ANU biography

Living people
Australian anthropologists
Australian women anthropologists
Bryn Mawr College alumni
Intel people
People from Hillsboro, Oregon
Scientists from Sydney
Stanford University alumni
Year of birth missing (living people)
Futurologists
Academic staff of the Australian National University
Officers of the Order of Australia
Cyberneticists
Women cyberneticists